Tom Gibson (1930 – June 1, 2021) was a Scottish-born Canadian photographer. 

Gibson was born in Edinburgh. From 1976 to 1996, he was a professor of photography at Concordia University in Montreal, Canada.

His work is included in the collections of the National Gallery of Canada, and the Art Gallery of Ontario.

References

External links
 Concordia University Records Management and Archives: Tom Gibson fonds

1930 births
2021 deaths
20th-century Canadian artists
20th-century Canadian photographers
21st-century Canadian artists
21st-century Canadian photographers
Academic staff of Concordia University